The Rhineland massacres, also known as the German Crusade of 1096 or Gzerot Tatnó ("Edicts of 4856"), were a series of mass murders of Jews perpetrated by mobs of French and German Christians of the People's Crusade in the year 1096, or 4856 according to the Hebrew calendar. These massacres are often seen as the first in a sequence of antisemitic events in Europe which culminated in the Holocaust.

Prominent leaders of crusaders involved in the massacres included Peter the Hermit and especially Count Emicho. As part of this persecution, the destruction of Jewish communities in Speyer, Worms and Mainz was noted as the Hurban Shum (Destruction of Shum). These were new persecutions of the Jews in which peasant crusaders from France and Germany attacked Jewish communities. A number of historians have referred to the violence as "pogroms".

Background

The preaching of the First Crusade inspired an outbreak of anti-Jewish violence. In parts of France and Germany, Jews were perceived as just as much of an enemy as Muslims: they were held responsible for the crucifixion, and they were more immediately visible than the distant Muslims. Many people wondered why they should travel thousands of miles to fight non-believers when there were already non-believers closer to home.

It is also likely that the crusaders were motivated by their need for money. The Rhineland communities were relatively wealthy, both due to their isolation, and because they were not restricted as Catholics were against moneylending. Many crusaders had to go into debt in order to purchase weaponry and equipment for the expedition; as Western Catholicism strictly forbade usury, many crusaders inevitably found themselves indebted to Jewish moneylenders. Having armed themselves by assuming the debt, the crusaders rationalized the killing of Jews as an extension of their Catholic mission.

There had not been so broad a movement against Jews by Catholics since the seventh century's mass expulsions and forced conversions. While there had been a number of regional persecutions of Jews by Catholics, such as the one in Metz in 888, a plot against Jews in Limoges in 992, a wave of anti-Jewish persecution by Christian millenarian movements (which believed that Jesus was immediately to descend from Heaven) in the year 1000, and the threat of expulsion from Trier in 1066; these are all viewed "in the traditional terms of governmental outlawry rather than unbridled popular attacks." Also many movements against Jews (such as forced conversions by King Robert the Pious of France, Richard II, Duke of Normandy, and Henry II, Holy Roman Emperor around 1007–1012) had been suppressed by various popes and bishops. The passions that were aroused within the Catholic community by Pope Urban II's call for the first crusade had moved the persecution of Jews into a new chapter in history where previous constraints no longer held.

A relevant perspective on the extent of the era's antisemitism was recorded 40 years afterward by Jewish historian Solomon bar Simson. He stated that Godfrey of Bouillon swore:

Emperor Henry IV (after being notified of the pledge by Kalonymus Ben Meshullam, the Jewish leader in Mainz) issued an order prohibiting such an action. Godfrey claimed that he never really intended to kill Jews, but the community in Mainz and Cologne sent him a collected bribe of 500 silver marks.

Sigebert of Gembloux wrote that before "a war in behalf of the Lord" could be fought, it was essential that the Jews convert; those who resisted were "deprived of their goods, massacred, and expelled from the cities."

The first outbreaks of violence occurred in France. According to a contemporary chronicle of events written by an anonymous author in Mainz:

Richard of Poitiers wrote that Jewish persecution was widespread in France at the beginning of the expeditions to the east. The anonymous chronicler of Mainz admired the Jews:

In June and July 1095, Jewish communities in the Rhineland (north of the main departure areas at Neuss, Wevelinghoven, Altenahr, Xanten and Moers) were attacked, but the leadership and membership of these crusader groups was not chronicled. Some Jews dispersed eastward to escape the persecution.

On top of the general Catholic suspicion of Jews at the time, when the thousands of French members of the People's Crusade arrived at the Rhine, they had run out of provisions. To restock their supplies, they began to plunder Jewish food and property while attempting to force them to convert to Catholicism.

Not all crusaders who had run out of supplies resorted to murder; some, like Peter the Hermit, used extortion instead. While no sources claim he preached against the Jews, he carried a letter with him from the Jews of France to the community at Trier. The letter urged them to supply provisions to Peter and his men. The Solomon bar Simson Chronicle records that they were so terrified by Peter's appearance at the gates that they readily agreed to supply his needs. Whatever Peter's own position on the Jews was, men claiming to follow after him felt free to massacre Jews on their own initiative, to pillage their possessions. Sometimes Jews survived by being subjected to involuntary baptism, such as in Regensburg, where a crusading mob rounded up the Jewish community, forced them into the Danube, and performed a mass baptism. After the crusaders had left the region, these Jews returned to practicing Judaism.

According to David Nirenberg, the events of 1096 in the Rhineland "occupy a significant place in modern Jewish historiography and are often presented as the first instance of an antisemitism that would henceforth never be forgotten and whose climax was the Holocaust."

Folkmar and Gottschalk

In the spring of 1096, a number of small bands of knights and peasants, inspired by the preaching of the Crusade, set off from various parts of France and Germany (Worms and Cologne). The crusade of the priest Folkmar, beginning in Saxony, persecuted Jews in Magdeburg and later, on May 30, 1096, in Prague in Bohemia. The Catholic Bishop Cosmas attempted to prevent forced conversions, and the entire Catholic hierarchy in Bohemia preached against such acts. Duke Bretislaus II was out of the country and the Catholic Church's officials' protests were unable to stop the mob of crusaders.

The hierarchy of the Catholic Church as a whole condemned the persecution of the Jews in the regions affected (though their protests had little effect). Especially vocal were the parish priests (only one monk, named Gottschalk, is recorded as joining and encouraging the mob). Chronicler Hugo of Flavigny recorded how these religious appeals were ignored, writing:

In general, the crusader mobs did not fear any retribution, as the local courts did not have the jurisdiction to pursue them past their locality nor did they have the ability to identify and prosecute individuals out of the mob. The pleas of the clergy were ignored on similar grounds (no cases against individuals were brought forward for excommunication) and the mob believed that anyone preaching mercy to the Jews was doing so only because they had succumbed to Jewish bribery.

Gottschalk the monk went on to lead a crusade from the Rhineland and Lorraine into Hungary, occasionally attacking Jewish communities along the way. In late June 1096, the crusader mob of Gottschalk was welcomed by King Coloman of Hungary, but they soon began plundering the countryside and causing drunken disorder. The King then demanded they disarm. Once their weapons had been secured, the enraged Hungarians fell upon them and "the whole plain was covered with corpses and blood."

The priest Folkmar and his Saxons also met a similar fate from the Hungarians when they began pillaging villages there because "sedition was incited".

Emicho

The largest of these crusades, and the most involved in attacking Jews, was that led by Count Emicho. Setting off in the early summer of 1096, an army of around 10,000 men, women and children proceeded through the Rhine valley, towards the Main River and then to the Danube. Emicho was joined by William the Carpenter and Drogo of Nesle, among others from the Rhineland, eastern France, Lorraine, Flanders and even England.

Holy Roman Emperor Henry IV, absent in southern Italy, ordered the Jews to be protected when he learned of Emicho's intent. After some Jews were killed at Metz in May, John, Bishop of Speyer gave shelter to the Jewish inhabitants. Still, 12 Jews of Speyer were slain by crusaders on May 3. The Bishop of Worms also attempted to shelter Jews, but the crusaders broke into his episcopal palace and killed the Jews inside on May 18. At least 800 Jews were massacred in Worms when they refused Catholic baptism.

News of Emicho's crusade spread quickly, and he was prevented from entering Mainz on May 25 by Bishop Ruthard. Emicho also took an offering of gold raised by the Jews of Mainz in hope to gain his favor and their safety. Bishop Ruthard tried to protect the Jews by hiding them in his lightly fortified palace. Nevertheless, Emicho did not prevent his followers from entering the city on May 27 and a massacre followed. Many among the Christian business class (the burghers) in Mainz, had working ties with Jews and gave them shelter from the mobs (as the burghers in Prague had done). The Mainz burghers joined with the militia of the bishop and the burgrave (the town's military governor) in fighting off the first waves of crusaders. This stand had to be abandoned when crusaders continued to arrive in ever greater numbers, and the militia of the bishop together with the bishop himself fled and left the Jews to be slaughtered by the crusaders. Despite the example of the burghers, many ordinary citizens in Mainz and other the towns were caught up in the frenzy and joined in the persecution and pillaging. Mainz was the site of the greatest violence, with at least 1,100 Jews (and possibly more) being killed by troops under Clarambaud and Thomas.  Given the choice between flight, death, and conversion, some Jews opted for a desperate fourth alternative: active martyrdom, that is, killing their family and themselves. One man, named Isaac, was forcefully converted, but wracked with guilt, later killed his family and burned himself alive in his house. Another woman, Rachel, murdered her four children with her own hands so that they would not be kidnapped and "raised in the way of error" as Christians.  Chronicler Solomon bar Simpson compared Rachel to the martyrdom of the woman and her seven sons in an attempt to make sense of her desperate act.

Eliezer ben Nathan, a Jewish chronicler at the times, paraphrased Habakkuk 1:6 and wrote of

On May 29 Emicho arrived at Cologne, where most Jews had already left or were hiding in Christian houses. In Cologne, other smaller bands of crusaders met Emicho, and they left with quite a lot of money taken from the Jews there. Emicho continued towards Hungary, soon joined by some Swabians. Coloman of Hungary refused to allow them through Hungary. Count Emicho and his warriors besieged Moson (or Wieselburg), on the Leitha. This led Coloman to prepare to flee into Russia, but the morale of the crusader mob began to fail, which inspired the Hungarians, and most of the mob was slaughtered or drowned in the river. Count Emicho and a few of the leaders escaped into Italy or back to their own homes. William the Carpenter and other survivors eventually joined Hugh of Vermandois and the main body of crusader knights. Holy Roman Emperor Henry IV overruled Church law and permitted forcibly converted Jews to return to Judaism.

Later attacks on Jews

Later in 1096, Godfrey of Bouillon also collected tribute from the Jews in Mainz and Cologne, and would have participated in pogroms himself if he had not been ordered by Henry IV not to do so. Saint Louis University Professor Thomas F. Madden, author of A Concise History of the Crusades, claims the Jewish defenders of Jerusalem retreated to their synagogue to "prepare for death" once the Crusaders had breached the outer walls of the city during the siege of 1099. The chronicle of Ibn al-Qalanisi mentions the building was set on fire while the Jews were still inside. The Crusaders were supposedly reported as hoisting up their shields and singing "Christ We Adore Thee!" while they circled the fiery complex." However, a contemporary Jewish letter written shortly after the siege does not mention the burning synagogue. But playing on the religious schism between the two sects of Judaism, Arabist S.D. Goitein speculates the reason the incident is missing from the letter is because it was written by Karaite Jews and the synagogue belonged to Rabbinic Jews.

Following the siege, Jews captured from the Dome of the Rock, along with native Christians, were made to clean the city of the slain. Tancred took some Jews as prisoners of war and deported them to Apuleia in southern Italy. Several of these Jews did not make it to their final destination as "Many of them were [...] thrown into the sea or beheaded on the way." Numerous Jews and their holy books (including the Aleppo Codex) were held ransom by Raymond of Toulouse. The Karaite Jewish community of Ashkelon (Ascalon) reached out to their coreligionists in Alexandria to first pay for the holy books and then rescued pockets of Jews over several months. All that could be ransomed were liberated by the summer of 1100.  The few who could not be rescued were either converted to Catholicism or murdered. The First Crusade ignited a long tradition of organized violence against Jews in European culture.  Jewish money was also used in France for financing the Second Crusade; the Jews were also attacked in many instances, but not on the scale of the attacks of 1096.  In England, the Third Crusade was the pretext for the expulsion of the Jews and the confiscation of their money. The two Shepherds' Crusades, in 1251 and 1320, also saw attacks on Jews in France; the second in 1320 also attacked and killed Jews in Aragon.

Catholic Church response

The massacre of the Rhineland Jews by the People's Crusade and other associated persecutions were condemned by the leaders and officials of the Catholic Church. The Church and its members had previously carried out policies to protect the presence of Jews in Christian culture. For example, the twenty-five letters regarding the Jews of Pope Gregory I from the late sixth century became the primary texts for the canons, or Church laws, which were implanted to not only regulate Jewish life in Europe but also to protect it. These policies did have limits to them; the Jews were granted protection and the right to their faith if they did not threaten Christianity and remained entirely submissive to Christian rule. These regulations were enacted in a letter by Pope Alexander II in 1063. Their goal was to define the place of the Jews in Christian society. The Dispar nimirum of 1060, was the late eleventh-century papal policy concerning the Jews. It rejected acts of violence and punishments of the Jews, and it enforced the idea of protecting the Jews because they were not the enemy of the Christians. This papal policy aimed at creating a balance of privilege and restrictions on Jews so that the Christians did not see their presence as a threat. Sixty years after the Dispar nimirum, inspired by the atrocities of the First Crusade, the Sicut Judaeis was issued. It was a more detailed and organized text of the position of the papacy concerning the treatment of Jews. This text was enacted by Pope Calixtus II in 1120. It defined the limits of the Jews' eternal servitude and continued the reinforcement of the Jews' right to their faith.

The bishops of Mainz, Speyer, and Worms had attempted to protect the Jews of those towns within the walls of their palaces. In 1084 Rüdiger Huzmann (1073–1090), bishop of Speyer, established an area for the Jews to live, to protect them from potential violence. Rüdiger's successor, Bishop John, continued the protection of Jews during the First Crusade. During the attack on Speyer, John saved many of the Jews, providing them protection in his castle. Bishop John had the hands of many attackers cut off. Archbishop Ruthard of Mainz tried to save the Jews by gathering them in his courtyard; this was unsuccessful as Emicho and his troops stormed the palace. Ruthard managed to save a small number of Jews by putting them on boats in the Rhine. The Archbishop of Cologne, Hermann II, sent many of the Jews to outlying villages, so that they would be safe from Crusaders. The archbishop of Trier was less effective; he favored protecting the Jews from violence, but during the attack on Trier, he hid and did not take any action to help them. Some bishops, like Albrecht of Magdeburg (1513–1545), went as far as offering the Crusaders silver to spare the Jews.

After the First Crusade, there was a continued effort made by the popes to protect the Jews, so that violence that occurred in the Rhineland Valley would not reoccur. In 1272, Pope Gregory X stated that the Jews "are not capable of harming Christians, nor do they know how to do so." Popes continually assured the Christian people that the Jews were not the enemy, but the Saracens were because they opposed Christianity, and Jews would only become the enemy if they challenged the religion. Following Gregory X's lead, Pope Benedict XIII clearly stated to the Christian people how to treat the Jews. "Jews are never to be burdened beyond the limits of the present constitution. [They are not] to be molested, to be offered in their persons, or to have their goods seized... [Rather, they are to be treated] humanely and with clemency..." Benedict enforced the privileges given to the Jews by warning the Christians that their actions toward the Jewish people must not violate those given to them by the Church.

Fifty years later, when St. Bernard of Clairvaux was urging recruitment for the Second Crusade, he specifically criticized the attacks on Jews that had occurred in the First Crusade. Though Clairvaux considered the Jews to be "personae non gratae", he condemned in his letters the crusaders' attacks on the Jews and ordered protection for Jewish communities. There is debate on Bernard's exact motivations: he may have been disappointed that the People's Crusade devoted so much time and resources to attacking the Jews of Western Europe while contributing almost nothing to the attempt to retake the Holy Land itself, the result being that Bernard was urging the knights to maintain focus on the goal of protecting Catholic interests in the Holy Land. It is equally possible that Bernard held the belief that forcibly converting the Jews was immoral or perceived that greed motivated the original Rhineland massacre: both sentiments are echoed in the canon of Albert of Aachen in his chronicle of the First Crusade. Albert of Aachen's view was that the People's Crusaders were uncontrollable semi-Catholicized country-folk (citing the "goose incident," which Hebrew chronicles corroborate) who massacred hundreds of Jewish women and children and that the People's Crusaders were themselves slaughtered by Turkish forces in Asia Minor.

Jewish reactions
News of the attacks spread quickly and reached the Jewish communities in and around Jerusalem long before the crusaders themselves arrived. However, Jews were not systematically killed in Jerusalem, despite being caught up in the general indiscriminate violence caused by the crusaders once they reached the city.

The Hebrew chronicles portray the Rhineland Jews as martyrs who willingly sacrificed themselves in order to honour God and to preserve their own honour.

Sigebert of Gembloux wrote that most of those Jews who converted before the crusader threat later returned to Judaism.

In the years following the crusade, the Jewish communities were faced with troubling questions about murder and suicide, which were normally sins for Jews just as they were for Catholics. The Rhineland Jews looked to historical precedents since Biblical times to justify their actions: the honourable suicide of Saul, the Maccabees revolt against Antiochus IV Epiphanes, the suicide pact at Masada, and the Bar Kochba revolt were seen as justifiable deaths in the face of a stronger enemy. Despite this, the suicidal and homicidal nature of the Rhineland Jews' actions largely separated the events of 1096 from previous incidents in Jewish history. While the events of Masada most closely parallel those of the Rhineland Massacres, it is important to note that the dramatic suicides of that event were often downplayed by Rabbinic scholars, even to the point of Masada's total omission from some Rabbinic histories. Consequently, the deaths of the Rhineland Jews still held a great deal of novelty and presented confusion for both contemporary and subsequent theologians and historians.

The Biblical moment that was most commonly evoked by chroniclers of the Rhineland Massacres was the Binding of Isaac, to which several allusions appear throughout the major primary sources, the Mainz Anonymous, the Soloman bar Simson Chronicle, and the Eliezer bar Nathan Chronicle (though allusions to this moment persist beyond these sources, and even in to more modern interpretations). Although it was the most common Biblical reference, the details of the Binding of Isaac presented significant dissimilarities (alongside definite parallels) that put the actions of the Rhineland Jewry at odds with the Biblical narrative. While Isaac was spared from sacrifice by divine intervention, the Jews of the Rhineland committed their ritual suicide to its end. This influenced novel interpretations of the binding of Isaac. The Soloman bar Simson Chronicle interprets the sacrifice of the Rhineland Jews as a similar, though even greater expression of righteousness and piety than that of Abraham, a theme echoed throughout other chronicles of the events. Similarly, a preexisting alternative Midrashic reading of the Binding of Isaac claiming that Isaac truly was sacrificed gained a newfound popularity following the events of 1096. Still, a total synthesis of the Binding of Isaac (particularly as a condemnation of human sacrifice) with the ritual deaths of 1096 was never quite achieved, and remains an inconsistency between Jewish theology and historical practice.

Several 20th century Jewish authors have related the events of 1096 to an underlying theme of human sacrifice. Historian Israel Yuval understood these choices as a manifestation of a Messianic theology that was uniquely tied to medieval Jews living in the midst of Latin Christendom. This theology understood the Messiah's coming as a time of vengeance against those who transgressed against God and the Jewish people, as well as a process that was sensitive to the blood of Jewish martyrs. Such ideas are alluded to in the Sefer Hasidim, a work of the twelfth century consisting of an amalgamation of Rabbinic teachings common to the era and the centuries immediately preceding it. Additionally relevant was a medieval Ashkenazi genealogical interpretation of Christians as descendants of the Biblical Esau (referred to as Edomites), over whom the Jews (the descendants of Jacob) would eventually succeed and gain dominion. Following from this, the events of 1096 presented an opportunity for the Rhineland Jews to ritually offer their deaths as an example of Christian transgression and spur the Messianic Age – an analysis supported by the frequent ritual tone and symbolism employed by Jewish chroniclers while describing the deaths, and their somewhat lesser interest for Jews who simply died by Christian hands directly. This included frequent descriptions of suicides occurring within synagogues (which were on occasion burning), and the shedding of blood on the Holy Ark. Despite this, somewhat more post hoc explanations provided by Medieval Jewish chroniclers also existed. Most often, the homicide of the Rhineland children was explained by the adage "lest they dwell among the Gentiles; it is better that they die innocent and not guilty", meaning that it was better to kill Jewish children and prevent them from losing their religion than to allow them to die later as a non-Jew. The descriptions of Jewish parents killing their children was shocking to Christian ears, and may have served as fuel for later accusations of blood libel.

Prior to the Crusades, the Jews were divided among three major areas which were largely independent of one another.  These were the Jews living in Islamic nations (still the majority), those in the Byzantine Empire and those in the Catholic West. With the persecutions that began around 1096, a new awareness of the entire people took hold across all of these groups, reuniting the three separate strands.

In the late 19th century, Jewish historians used the episode as a demonstration of the need for Zionism (that is, for a new Jewish state).

References

Bibliography

Primary sources

Manuscripts

Albert of Aix, Historia Hierosolymitana
Mainz Anonymous
 Solomon bar Simson Chronicle
 Eliezer bar Nathan Chronicle

Primary

Secondary sources
 (Hebrew)

Journal articles
 
 
 
 
 (Hebrew) 
 (German) 
 
 

 
 (German)

External links
 Albert of Aix and Ekkehard of Aura: Emico and the Slaughter of the Rhineland Jews.
 The Jewish Encyclopedia: The Crusades
 Map and picture concerning German crusade
 Who Was Count Emicho? by Dr. Henry Abramson

1096 in Europe
11th-century massacres
Antisemitism in France
First Crusade
Jewish French history
Jewish German history
Medieval anti-Jewish pogroms